USS Nathan James is a fictional guided missile destroyer of the United States Navy, used as the setting for the 1988 post-apocalyptic novel The Last Ship and the television series of the same name

Book 

USS Nathan James (DDG-151) is the lead ship of her class. The number at the end of the hull code stands for the ship's position in the series, while the letters "DD" stand for "Destroyer" and the "G" for "Guided Missile". The ship was named after a U.S. Navy ensign who was awarded the Navy Cross for his actions during the Battle of Leyte Gulf in World War II.

Weaponry
Nathan James is armed with two 61-cell Mk 41 Vertical Launching Systems and carries a payload of 28 nuclear-tipped Tomahawk land-attack cruise missiles (each rated at 200 kilotons) for each Vertical Launching System, for a total of 56 nuclear-tipped Tomahawk cruise missiles.

Television series 

In the television series, USS Nathan James is an Arleigh Burke-class guided-missile destroyer homeported at Virginia's Naval Station Norfolk, rather than in Norway, as in the book. Its hull code is DDG-151, where in the book it is DDG-80, likely because  was christened after the release of the novel. In the canon of the show, it is named after a U.S. naval captain from World War II and was authorized in September 2001, laid down in June 2002, and launched in January 2004. The ship's motto is "The Spear of the Navy".

In the pilot, "Phase Six", it is mentioned that Nathan James has a crew complement of 217.  By the season 2 finale, "A More Perfect Union", CDR Chandler mentions that there are 204 crewmen on Nathan James.

In the season 2 finale, "A More Perfect Union", Nathan James arrives in St. Louis, Missouri after defeating the Immunes and is scheduled to spend the next few months in drydock.

In "The Scott Effect", CAPT Slattery, CDR Garnett, CMDCM Jeter, LTJG Mason, Dr. Rios, GM2 Miller, and SA Diaz are taken prisoner from a Vietnamese nightclub by Asian pirates.  In "Shanzhai", CAPT Chandler, as ranking officer, retakes command of Nathan James and names LT Granderson acting executive officer over LT Cameron Burk, a senior lieutenant who held the conn while CAPT Slattery was off-ship. Upon the rescue of the prisoners of war in "Dog Day", CAPT Chandler returns command of the ship to CAPT Slattery.

In "Casus Belli", Nathan James is under the command of CDR Kara Green and her executive officer is CDR Carlton Burk.

In the series finale, "Commitment", Nathan James is severely damaged and eventually sinks after ramming an enemy vessel, which also sinks.

, a real Flight IIA Arleigh Burke-class destroyer, stood in for Nathan James during filming.

See also 
 List of fictional ships

References 

Nathan James, USS
The Last Ship (TV series)